Toshihiko Uchiyama may refer to:

 Toshihiko Uchiyama (footballer, born 1978) (内山 俊彦), Japanese footballer
 Toshihiko Uchiyama (footballer, born 1989) (内山 俊彦), Japanese footballer